Dark Ages: Werewolf is a supplementary role-playing book published by White Wolf, Inc.

History
White Wolf resumed publishing historical role-playing games in 2002, and relaunched Dark Ages: Vampire (2002) as a core rulebook; supplements were added for the other magical groups of the World of Darkness, and each of these was dependent upon Dark Ages: Vampire to play, including Dark Ages: Werewolf (2003).

Description
The Dark Ages: Werewolf supplement allows gamers to run scenarios for the Werewolf system in Medieval Europe (circa 1230 AD).

Publication information
Published in 2003, 2nd Edition Print. Hardback. White wolf Catalogue Number: WW20005 , 232 pages. Original Game concept credited to Mark Rein·Hagen.

References

Gamebooks
Role-playing games introduced in 2003
Werewolf: The Apocalypse